Gymnoscelis distatica is a moth in the family Geometridae. It is found in India.

References

Moths described in 1958
Gymnoscelis
Insects of India